Martin Hemmer is a West German-German slalom canoeist who competed from the late 1980s to the early 1990s. He won two bronze medals at the ICF Canoe Slalom World Championships (K1: 1991, K1 team: 1989).

World Cup individual podiums

References

German male canoeists
Living people
Year of birth missing (living people)
Medalists at the ICF Canoe Slalom World Championships